Commitment, Renewal and Order (CREO) is a political party in Guatemala.

History
The party was established on 27 October 2010. In the 2011 general elections it nominated Eduardo Suger as its presidential candidate; Suger finished third with 16% of the vote. In the Congressional elections the party finished fifth with 9% of the vote, winning 12 of the 158 seats.

In the 2015 general elections the party entered into an electoral pact with the Unionist Party. In the Congressional elections the alliance received 5.73% of the vote, winning five seats in Congress. Its presidential candidate was leader Roberto González Díaz-Durán, who received 3.48% of the vote

In the 2019 general elections, the party received 4.41% of the Congressional vote and won six seats. Its presidential ticket, with Julio Héctor Estrada and Yara Argueta running for President and Vice President respectively, focused their campaign on strengthening state institutions and reformation of the penal system, including the construction of a high-security prison in the north of Guatemala and received 3.77% of the vote.

Election results

Congress

President

Notes

References

External links
Official website

2010 establishments in Guatemala
Conservative parties in Guatemala
Political parties established in 2010
Political parties in Guatemala
Social conservative parties